A list of films produced in the Soviet Union in 1943 (see 1943 in film).

1943

See also
1943 in the Soviet Union

External links
 Soviet films of 1943 at the Internet Movie Database

1943
Soviet
Films